The Arcadian is an American science fiction feature film set in a post-apocalyptic world. Plot elements have not been revealed, but official press releases have stated, "The Arcadian" follows “The Lighthouse Keeper” on a story of revenge and redemption in a strange future world reminiscent of wild 1970s pop sci-fi. The visual world of The Arcadian is an homage to the work of underground illustrators while creating something that is both unique and distinct."

Cast
J. LaRose as The Lighthouse Keeper
Deshja Driggs-Hall as Astrid
Sab Shimono as Moto
Bill Cobbs as Charles
Lance Henriksen as Father Reed
Yuri Lowenthal as Kraken
Tara Platt as Tempest
Brian Thompson as Agmundr
Adam Sessler as Marco
Bonnie Morgan as Agmundr's Sculpture
Rob Gorden as Erik
Boris Kievsky as Anchor

Release
No release date has been specified. Principal photography ceased in November 2009 and post-production was scheduled to be completed in the spring of 2010. It was released on April 28, 2011 in the United Kingdom.

Production
Production on the Arcadian took place across the United States and Canada, notably several areas of the coast in Nova Scotia were used for background plates and set pieces. Second unit production involved local area crews.

Additionally, the film was shot entirely on a Canon EOS 5D Mark II camera.

References

External links
 

American science fiction films
2010s science fiction films
Films shot in Nova Scotia
2010s English-language films
2010s American films